Beatrix Thomson (1900–1986) was a British stage actress. She also made a handful of appearances in film and television. A graduate of RADA, she made her West End debut in John Galsworthy's Loyalties in 1922. She was married to the actor Claude Rains from 1924 to 1935.

Her film roles include Lucie Dreyfus in Dreyfus (1931) and the title role in Michael Powell's quota quickie Crown v. Stevens (1936).

She also wrote several works for the stage.

Selected stage credits
 Loyalties by John Galsworthy (1922)
 The Rivals by Richard Brinsley Sheridan (1925)
 Three Sisters by Anton Chekhov (1926)
 The Berg by Ernest Raymond (1929)
 The Way Out by H. C. McNeile (1930)

Selected filmography
 Dreyfus (1931)
 The Old Curiosity Shop (1934)
 Crown v. Stevens (1936)
 The Story of Shirley Yorke (1948)

As dramatist
Special Delivery, thriller, adapted from a short story
Set to Music, incorporating music without becoming a musical
Woman Alive, adaptation of Susan Ertz's short story
Sons of Adam, dealing with racial tension
All four were written by 1938, and at least one, Sons of Adam, was staged in London.

References

Bibliography
 Borovsky, Victor. A Triptych from the Russian Theatre: An Artistic Biography of the Komissarzhevskys. C. Hurst & Co, 2001.
 Skal, David J. & Rains, Jessica. Claude Rains: An Actor's Voice. University Press of Kentucky, 2008.
 Wearing, J.P. The London Stage 1920-1929: A Calendar of Productions, Performers, and Personnel. Rowman & Littlefield, 2014.

External links

1900 births
1986 deaths
People from Wandsworth
British stage actresses
British film actresses